The 2003 Berlin Marathon was the 30th running of the annual marathon race held in Berlin, Germany, held on 28 September 2003. Kenya's Paul Tergat won the men's race in 2:04:55 hours, while the women's race was won by Japan's Yasuko Hashimoto in 2:26:32. Tergat broke the men's marathon world record by a margin of 43 seconds, making him the first man to complete the distance under two hours and five minutes.

Results

Men

Women

References 

 Results. Association of Road Racing Statisticians. Retrieved 2020-04-02.

External links 
 Official website

2003 in Berlin
Berlin Marathon
Berlin Marathon
Berlin Marathon
Berlin Marathon